Friedrich-Erich Obleser (21 February 1923 – 5 June 2004) was a German general in the Bundeswehr. During World War II, he served as a fighter pilot in the Luftwaffe. A fighter ace, Obleser was credited with 120 aerial victories and was a recipient of the Knight's Cross of the Iron Cross, the highest award in the military and paramilitary forces of Nazi Germany during World War II. For his post-war service in the German Air Force, he received the Grand Cross with Star of the Order of Merit of the Federal Republic of Germany.

Early life and career
Obleser was born on 21 February 1923 in Pottenstein in the district of Baden in Lower Austria in Austria. In 1940, he volunteered for military service in the Luftwaffe. Following flight training, Obleser was assigned to 8. Staffel (8th squadron) of Jagdgeschwader 52 (JG 52—52nd Fighter Wing), a squadron of III. Gruppe of JG 52.

World War II
World War II in Europe had begun on Friday 1 September 1939 when German forces invaded Poland. In January 1943, Obleser arrived with 8. Staffel under command of Hauptmann Günther Rall at the Gigant airfield which was located in the vicinity of Salsk. At the time, the Red Army had launched Operation Koltso, the final phase of the Battle of Stalingrad. Rall made Obleser his wingman and also appointed him as technical officer of the Staffel, a position which was responsible for the overall readiness of the equipment and aircraft. Obleser flew his first combat mission on 12 January 1943 on the Eastern Front. There, he claimed his first aerial victory on 28 March over a Bell P-39 Airacobra. On 28 May 1943, Obleser was wounded when his Messerschmitt Bf 109 G-4 (Werknummer 19284—factory number) was hit by anti-aircraft artillery resulting in a forced landing at Varenikovskaya. Following his convalescence, he was appointed Staffelkapitän (squadron leader) of 8. Staffel of JG 52 on 6 July 1943, succeeding Rall who took command of III. Gruppe.

Obleser was awarded the Knight's Cross of the Iron Cross on 23 March 1944 following his 80th aerial victory. At one point he questioned the aerial victory claims made by Erich Hartmann. Hartmann asked Rall to have Obleser transferred to be Hartmann's wingman for a while. Obleser became a witness on some of Hartmann's claims and no longer questioned Hartmann's claims. On 21 July 1944, Obleser was credited with his 100th aerial victory. He was the 87th Luftwaffe pilot to achieve the century mark.

On 12 December, III. The Gruppe flew relatively few missions at the time. Obleser toyed around with a Panzerfaust, a recoil-less anti-tank weapon, in an attempt to increase its firing range. On 30 December, Obleser was severely wounded when a Panzerfaust exploded in his hand. He did not see any further action before the end of the war in May 1945. He was temporarily replaced by Leutnant Karl Gratz until Leutnant Viktor Petermann officially succeeded Obleser on 7 January 1945 as commander of 10. Staffel.

Later life
After Obleser was released from US captivity, he worked as a commissioner of a recycling company, which predominantly had to dismantle and dispose of bomber aircraft. He then became head of an industrial application department in the private industry. In 1956, Obleser continued his military career, joining the German Air Force of West Germany as a Hauptmann. Following multiple assignments to various fighter units, Obleser was appointed wing commander of Jagdgeschwader 72 in Leck, later known as Jagdbombergeschwader 43, and then commander of Jagdbombergeschwader 31 "Boelcke". Obleser then held the position of system officer for the multirole combat aircraft (MRCA) within the German Air Staff. He then was appointed general manager of the NATO MRCA Management Agency.

Obleser then served as chief of the Air Force Office and commanding general of the Air Force Support Command. From 1 October 1978 until his retirement on 31 March 1983, he held the position of Inspector of the Air Force in the Bundeswehr, achieving the rank of Generalleutnant.

In June 1981, the Federal Minister of Defence Hans Apel threatened Obleser with early retirement following Obleser's report to the Defense Committee of the German Bundestag. Obleser had stated that, due to the latest defense budget cut, the German Air Force could only partially fulfill its obligations. Apel had viewed Obleser's statement as lack of loyalty towards his superiors. Earlier in March 1981, although skeptical of the proposal, Obleser had approved two budget cuts suggested by Inspector General of the Bundeswehr Jürgen Brandt.

Obleser died of natural causes on 5 June 2004 in Neunkirchen-Seelscheid, at 81 years of age.

Summary of career

Aerial victory claims
According to US historian David T. Zabecki, Obleser was credited with 120 aerial victories. Mathews and Foreman, authors of Luftwaffe Aces — Biographies and Victory Claims, researched the German Federal Archives and state that Obleser was credited with 112 aerial victories, all of which claimed on the Eastern Front. In addition to these claims, Obleser claimed nine undocumented aerial victories over United States Army Air Forces aircraft, two heavy bombers and seven fighter aircraft.

Victory claims were logged to a map-reference (PQ = Planquadrat), for example "PQ 34 Ost 86724". These sectors were then subdivided into 36 smaller units to give a location area 3 × 4 km in size.

Awards
 German Cross in Gold on 14 November 1943 as Leutnant in the III./Jagdgeschwader 52
 Knight's Cross of the Iron Cross on 23 March 1944 as Leutnant and Staffelführer of the 8./Jagdgeschwader 52
 Order of Merit of the Federal Republic of Germany
 Officer's Cross (April 1973)
 Commanders Cross (26 September 1979)
 Grand Cross with Star (4 March 1983)

Notes

References

Citations

Bibliography

External links

1923 births
2004 deaths
Luftwaffe pilots
German World War II flying aces
German Air Force pilots
Bundeswehr generals
Recipients of the Gold German Cross
Recipients of the Knight's Cross of the Iron Cross
German prisoners of war in World War II held by the United States
Knights Commander of the Order of Merit of the Federal Republic of Germany
Lieutenant generals of the German Air Force
People from Baden District, Austria